Nandrolone sulfate, also known as 19-nortestosterone 17β-sulfate and used medically as the sodium salt nandrolone sodium sulfate (brand names Keratyl, Nandrol, Nandain, Colirio Ocul Nandrol), is a synthetic androgen and anabolic steroid and a nandrolone ester which is or has been used as an ophthalmic drug in the form of eye drops in Spain, Denmark, Switzerland, France, Portugal, and Belgium.

See also
 List of androgen esters § Nandrolone esters

References

Androgens and anabolic steroids
Nandrolone esters
Ophthalmology drugs
Progestogens
Sulfate esters